New Mexican may refer to someone or something of, from, or related to the US State of New Mexico
A person from New Mexico; see List of people from New Mexico
A historical person from the Spanish viceroyalty or Mexican territory of Nuevo México
A historical person from the US territory of New Mexico
New Mexican cuisine, cuisine originating from New Mexico
New Mexican chile, group of peppers from New Mexico
New Mexican music (disambiguation)
New Mexican English, English dialects from New Mexico
New Mexican Spanish, Spanish dialect from New Mexico
The Santa Fe New Mexican, a newspaper published in Santa Fe, New Mexico

See also
New Mexico (disambiguation)
Hispano, Pueblo, Navajo, Apache, or other ethnic groups from or related to New Mexico